James Grimston may refer to:
James Grimston, 2nd Viscount Grimston (1711–1773), British peer and Member of Parliament
James Grimston, 3rd Viscount Grimston (1747–1808), British peer and Member of Parliament
James Grimston, 1st Earl of Verulam (1775–1845), British peer and Member of Parliament
James Grimston, 2nd Earl of Verulam (1809–1895), British peer and Conservative politician
James Grimston, 3rd Earl of Verulam (1852–1924), British peer and Conservative Member of Parliament
James Grimston, 4th Earl of Verulam (1880–1949), British peer, electrical engineer and businessman
James Grimston, 5th Earl of Verulam (1910–1960), British peer and businessman

See also
Grimston (disambiguation)